Baldwin High School is a public high school located in Baldwin, Nassau County, New York. This school serves students in grades 9 to 12 in the Baldwin Union Free School District. It is the eighth-largest high school in Nassau County.

As of the year 2018–19, the school had an enrollment of 1,548 students and 121.0 classroom teachers (on an FTE basis), for a student–teacher ratio of 12.8:1. There were 450 students (29.1% of enrollment) eligible for free lunch and 37 (2.4% of students) eligible for reduced-cost lunch.

Baldwin High School is nationally recognized as the "School of Excellence." and has been ranked by Newsweek in its annual list of America's Best High Schools on several occasions, including #837 in 2010, #804 in 2008, #971 in 2007, and #602 in 2006. Baldwin High School has been ranked by U.S. News & World Report among the top high schools in the nation in 2022, 2021, and 2020. This school was also designated a Recognition School for 2019-2020 and 2018-2019 by the New York State Education Department. The high school offers a multitude of extracurricular clubs, varsity sports, a robotics team, and a unique school-to-career program called the Academic Academies, allowing students to gain real work experience through coursework, internships, “Shadow Days” and competitions through various community and corporate partnerships. The high school's robust curriculum features an array of coursework unique to the district, such as a drone class, where students become FAA certified as a remote pilot. Baldwin High School also offers Advanced Placement and college-level courses that enable students to earn college credit, including a partnership with Nassau Community College (NCC), where students take classes directly on the campus. The graduation rate is currently 98%. The motto for Baldwin Union Free School District is, “We are innovative. We are inclusive. We are involved. We are Baldwin.” Dr. Neil Testa serves as principal of Baldwin High School.

Arts

The district has been named a Best Community for Music Education multiple times by the National Association of Music Merchants (NAMM) Foundation. Students in music have performed at countless public events and venues, including Carnegie Hall in New York City. Baldwin students are regularly invited to the All-State Festival and named Long Island Scholar-Artists. The young artists' work can be seen in the Art Supervisor's Association All county Art Exhibition, the Long Island Media Art Exhibit, Northwell Health hospitals, as well as several other venues. Most recently, the district hosted a “Projection Mapping” event that showcased student-produced work in the areas of fine arts and English language arts on the district’s building exteriors.

Athletics

Baldwin High School's athletics is branded by the mascot, the Baldwin Bruin. The Baldwin Lady Bruins won the NYS Championship in 2017 and 2018 as well as eight sectional titles. Baldwin Boys Basketball, Football, Baseball, Field Hockey and Boys Track Teams have all won sectional championships.

Notable alumni
 Taylor Dayne (born 1962, class of 1980), singer who has seven Billboard Top Ten hits; also known as Leslie Wunderman.
 Scott Israel, former sheriff of Broward County, Florida, current police chief of Opa-locka, Florida
 Joel Kovel (1936–2018), scholar and author known as a founder of eco-socialism
 Melanie Martinez (born 1995, class of 2013), singer/songwriter who placed sixth on season 3 of The Voice.
 James McLurkin (born 1972, class of 1990), Professor of Robotics and Electrical Engineering at Rice University. Earned SB (EE) and PhD (CS) at MIT, MS (EE) UC Berkeley.
 Jasmin Moghbeli (born 1983), US Marine Corps test pilot and NASA astronaut.
 Jeff Rosenstock (born 1982, class of 1999), singer/songwriter.
 Scott Rudin (born 1958, class of 1976), film producer and theatrical producer; in 2012, became one of the few people who have won an Emmy, Grammy, Oscar and Tony Award, and the first producer to do so.
 Dee Snider (born 1955, class of 1973), singer-songwriter, screenwriter, radio personality, and actor; most famous for his role as the frontman of the heavy metal band Twisted Sister.
 Chris Weidman (born 1984, class of 2002), NY state wrestling champion; two-time D-1 All-American wrestler at Hofstra; professional mixed martial artist Former UFC Middleweight Champion

References

External links
Baldwin High School website
City Data.com entry

Public high schools in New York (state)
Hempstead, New York
Schools in Nassau County, New York